Juan Luna de San Pedro y Novicio Ancheta (October 23, 1857 – December 7, 1899) was a Filipino painter, sculptor and a political activist of the Philippine Revolution during the late 19th century. He became one of the first recognized Philippine artists.

His winning the gold medal in the 1884 Madrid Exposition of Fine Arts, along with the silver win of fellow Filipino painter Félix Resurrección Hidalgo, prompted a celebration which was a major highlight in the memoirs of members of the Propaganda Movement, with the fellow Ilustrados toasting to the two painters' good health and to the brotherhood between Spain and the Philippines.

Well regarded for work done in the manner of European academies of his time, Luna painted literary and historical scenes, some with an underscore of political commentary. His allegorical works were inspired with classical balance, and often showed figures in theatrical poses.

Biography

Early life 
Born in the town of Badoc, Ilocos Norte in the northern Philippines, Luna was the third among the seven children of Joaquín Luna de San Pedro y Posadas and Laureana Novicio y Ancheta. In 1861, the Luna family moved to Manila and he went to Ateneo Municipal de Manila where he obtained his Bachelor of Arts degree. He excelled in painting and drawing, and was influenced by his brother, Manuel N. Luna, who, according to Filipino patriot José Rizal, was a better painter than Juan himself.

Luna enrolled at Escuela Nautica de Manila (now Philippine Merchant Marine Academy) and became a sailor. He took drawing lessons under the illustrious painting teacher Lorenzo Guerrero of Ermita, Manila. He also enrolled in the Academy of Fine Arts (Academia de Dibujo y Pintura) in Manila where he was influenced and taught how to draw by the Spanish artist Agustin Saez. However, Luna's vigorous brush strokes displeased his teacher and Luna was discharged from the academy. However, Guerrero was impressed by his skill and urged Luna to travel to Madrid to further pursue his work.

Travel abroad
In 1875 Manuel and Juan Luna traveled to Europe, where Manuel studied music and Juan painting. Juan entered the Escuela de Bellas Artes de San Fernando, where he befriended the painter Don Alejo Vera. Luna was discontented with the style of teaching in school and decided that it would be much better to work with Vera.

Vera brought him to Rome for some of his commissions, and Luna was exposed to the art of the Renaissance painters. It was in 1878 when his artistic talents was established with the opening of the first art exposition in Madrid which was called the Exposición Nacional de Bellas Artes (National Demonstration of Fine Arts). From then on, Luna became engrossed in painting and produced a collection of paintings that he exhibited in the 1881 Exposition.

In 1881, his La Muerte de Cleopatra (The Death of Cleopatra) won him a silver medal and came in second place. Luna's growing reputation as an artist led to a pensionado (pension) scholarship at 600 pesos annually through the Ayuntamiento of Manila. The condition was that he was obliged to develop a painting which captured the essence of Philippine history which would then become the Ayuntamiento's property.

Artistic career

In 1883 Luna started the painting demanded of him by the Ayuntamiento. In May 1884, he shipped the large canvas of the Spoliarium to Madrid for the year's Exposición Nacional de Bellas Artes. He was the first recipient of the three gold medals awarded in the exhibition and Luna gained recognition among the connoisseurs and art critics present. On June 25, 1884, Filipino and Spanish nobles organized an event celebrating Luna's win in the exhibition. That evening, Rizal prepared a speech for his friend, addressing the two significant things of his art work, which included the glorification of genius and the grandeur of his artistic skills.

Luna developed a friendly relationship with King Alfonso XII and was later commissioned by the Spanish Senate to paint a large canvas which was called the La Batalla de Lepanto (The Battle of Lepanto). He moved to Paris in 1885 where he opened his own studio and befriended Hidalgo. A year after, he finished the piece El pacto de sangre (The Blood Compact) in accordance with the agreement he had with the Manila City Council. Depicted in this piece was the blood compact ceremony between the Datu Sikatuna, one of the lords in Bohol island, and the Spanish conquistador Miguel López de Legazpi. It is now displayed in the Malacañan Palace. He also sent two other paintings in addition to the one required; the second canvas sent to Manila was a portrait of López de Legazpi reconstructed by Luna from his recollection of a similar portrait he saw in the hall of the Cabildo, and the third was of Governor-general Ramón Blanco y Erenas.

In 1887, Luna traveled back to Spain to enter in that year's Exposition two of his pieces, the La Batalla de Lepanto and Rendición de Granada (Surrender of Granada), which both won in the exhibition. He celebrated his triumph with his friends in Madrid with Graciano López-Jaena delivering the congratulatory speech. Luna's paintings are generally described as being vigorous and dramatic. With its elements of Romanticism, his style shows the influence of Delacroix, Rembrandt, and Daumier.

In 2015, a Luna masterpiece called ¿A Do...Va la Nave? sold for P46.8M at a Makati auction.

Marriage
On December 4, 1886, Luna married María de la Paz Pardo de Tavera, a sister of his friends Félix and Trinidad Pardo de Tavera. The couple traveled to Venice and Rome and settled in Paris. They had one son, whom they named Andrés, and a daughter, María de la Paz, nicknamed Bibi, who died when she was three years old. Luna was fond of his wife. However, the jealous Luna frequently accused Paz of having an affair with a certain Monsieur Dussaq. Finally in a fit of jealousy, he shot the door wherein his wife was behind, killing his wife and mother-in-law and wounding his brother-in-law Félix in the process, on September 22, 1892. He was arrested and murder charges were filed against him.

Luna was acquitted of charges on February 8, 1893, on the grounds of a crime of passion. Temporary insanity; the "unwritten law" at the time forgave men for killing unfaithful wives. He was ordered to pay the Pardo de Taveras a sum of 1,651 francs and eighty three cents, and an additional 25 francs for postage, in addition to the one franc of claims for damages ("dommages-intérêts"). Five days later, Luna went to Madrid with his brother, Antonio Luna, and his son, Andrés.

Murcia

A few years later, in October 1889, the artist travelled to southeast Spain, Murcia, as contained in the news release at the time, was provisionally installed in Moratalla where he made a portrait of the daughter of Juan Tamayo, an eminent man in this town. Passing through Murcia gave two portraits of the Queen Regent had made to the Provincial and City Council, respectively, and one of these was acquired by the provincial body for five hundred seventy-five pesetas installed on top of the Hall of Sessions of the Provincial Palace and then going to the presidential office in April 1932, one year after the proclamation of the Second Spanish Republic, enters as a deposit Museum of Murcia along with several official portraits of royal iconography, being included in the different inventories and catalogs without sufficient data or references, just a terse "DJ.LUNA" as artistic attribution.

Final years

In 1894 Luna moved back to the Philippines and traveled to Japan in 1896, returning during the Philippine Revolution of the Cry of Balintawak. On September 16, 1896, he and his brother Antonio Luna were arrested by Spanish authorities for being involved with the Katipunan rebel army. Despite his imprisonment, Luna was still able to produce a work of art which he gave to a visiting priest. He was pardoned by the Spanish courts on May 27, 1897, and was released from prison and he traveled back to Spain in July. He returned to Manila in November 1898. In 1898, he was appointed by the executive board of the Philippine revolutionary government as a member of the Paris delegation which was working for the diplomatic recognition of the República Filipina (Philippine Republic). In 1899, upon the signing of the Treaty of Paris (1898), Luna was named a member of the delegation to Washington, D.C. to press for the recognition of the Philippine government.

He traveled back to the Philippines in December 1899 upon hearing of the murder of his brother Antonio by the Kawit Battalion in Cabanatuan.

Death
He traveled to Hong Kong and died there on December 7, 1899, from cardiac arrest. His remains were buried in Hong Kong and in 1920 were exhumed and kept in Andrés Luna's house, to be later transferred to a niche at the Crypt of San Agustin Church in the Philippines. Five years later, Juan would be reinstated as a world-renowned artist and Peuple et Rois, his last major work, was acclaimed as the best entry to the Saint Louis World's Fair in St. Louis, Missouri. Some of his paintings were destroyed by fire in World War II.

Media portrayal
Portrayed by Allan Paule in the 1996 TV series Bayani and the 2015 film Heneral Luna.
Portrayed by Bryan Benedict in the 2014 TV series Ilustrado.

See also
Spoliarium
The Blood Compact
España y Filipinas
Antonio Luna
José Rizal
José Honorato Lozano
Damián Domingo
Fernando Amorsolo
Fabián de la Rosa
Justiniano Asuncion
Félix Resurrección Hidalgo
Emilio Aguinaldo

References

External links
 INQUIRER.net: Juan Luna's work
 López Memorial Museum: Juan  
 Five Classics of Modern Philippine Art

1857 births
1899 deaths
19th-century Filipino painters
Filipino portrait painters
Impressionist painters
Orientalist painters
Filipino sculptors
People of the Philippine Revolution
Filipino Freemasons
Filipino exiles
Filipinos convicted of murder
Filipinos imprisoned abroad
Filipino murderers
Filipino people of Spanish descent
Ilocano people
People from Ilocos Norte
People of Spanish colonial Philippines
Ateneo de Manila University alumni
Real Academia de Bellas Artes de San Fernando alumni
Burials at San Agustin Church (Manila)